SS Ransom A. Moore was a Liberty ship built in the United States during World War II. She was named after Ransom A. Moore, an American agronomist and professor at the University of Wisconsin-Madison.

Construction 
Ransom A. Moore was laid down on 18 October 1944, under a Maritime Commission (MARCOM) contract, MC hull 2330, by J.A. Jones Construction, Panama City, Florida; sponsored by Mrs. Emmett Assenheimer, the wife of the director of Procurement and Expediting, JAJCC, and launched on 21 November 1944.

History
She was allocated to J. H. Winchester & Company, Inc., 30 November 1944. On 1 October 1948, she was placed in the National Defense Reserve Fleet, in Beaumont, Texas.

She was sold for scrapping, 15 March 1970, to Luria Bros. and Co., Inc., for $41,280. She was withdrawn from the fleet, 15 June 1970.

References

Bibliography 

 
 
 
 

 

Liberty ships
Ships built in Panama City, Florida
1944 ships
Beaumont Reserve Fleet